Janss may refer to:

People 
 Edmee Janss (born 1965), Dutch cricketer
 Emily Janss (born 1978), American soccer player

Other uses 
 Janss Investment Company, a defunct American real estate developer
 Janss Marketplace, a shopping mall in Thousand Oaks, California